is a 1952 black-and-white Japanese film directed by Kazuo Mori made for Toho and starring Toshiro Mifune and Takashi Shimura. The script was written by Akira Kurosawa.

Plot
Araki Mataemon (Toshiro Mifune), a renowned swordsman, helps a young man find vengeance, an event known as the Igagoe vendetta. The opening scene has Araki sternly accosting Jinza with a formal proclamation of vengeance for the killing of his family member. Jinza (Takashi Shimura) cackles villainously and an epic fight commences.

Just then a narrator breaks in to explain that this is a traditional version of the showdown at Kagiya Corner that has been told through the centuries which happened at the start of the 17th century. It is about a vendetta because of the killing of a family member, and the samurai connected with the family want revenge and Araki is one of the samurai who go looking for a showdown. The facts surrounding the vendetta have been expanded and distorted through the telling, and the villain Jinza was actually a noble man and the close friend of Mataemon Araki, whom he faces off against at Kagiya corner. The narrative returns to November 7, 1634, and Mataemon's party arrives at an inn on the site one hour before the fight will take place. As the men prepare for their ambush, we get a series of flashbacks filling in the backstory piece by piece.

Cast
 Toshiro Mifune as Araki Mataemon
 Takashi Shimura as Jinza
 Minoru Chiaki as Matagoro
 Daisuke Katō as Mago
 Kokuten Kōdō as the Innkeeper
 Bokuzen Hidari as Magoemon the elder
 Toranosuke Ogawa as Buemon
 Yuriko Hamada 
 Akihiko Katayama 
 Shin Tokudaiji

References

External links
 

1952 films
1950s Japanese-language films
Samurai films
Films set in feudal Japan
Films produced by Sōjirō Motoki
Films directed by Kazuo Mori
Toho films
Films with screenplays by Akira Kurosawa
Japanese black-and-white films
1950s Japanese films